Mississippi Highway 395 (MS 395) is a short state highway in east-central Mississippi. It connects the small communities of Arlington and Plattsburg, along with MS 19, with the town of Noxapater.

Route description

MS 395 begins in northern Neshoba County at an intersection with MS 19 in Arlington. The highway heads north through a mix of farmland and wooded areas for a few miles before crossing into Winston County. The highway immediately passes through the community of Plattsburg, where it has an intersection with Plattsburg Road, which leads a short distance away to MS 25. It winds its way northward through woodlands for the next several miles, crossing a couple of small creeks and having  an intersection with Liberty Road (also leads to MS 25), before curving eastward to pass through farmland an enter the town of Noxapater along W Main Street. MS 395 passes through neighborhoods before coming to an end at the center of downtown, at an intersection with MS 15 (Kilpatrick Street), with the road continuing east as MS 490 (E Main Street).

The entire length of Mississippi Highway 395 is a rural, two-lane, state highway.

Major intersections

References

395
Transportation in Neshoba County, Mississippi
Transportation in Winston County, Mississippi